Ronald How (1929 – 2011) was an English international motorcycle speedway rider.

Career summary 
How won seven Championships and six National Trophy wins in a 15-season career. He also rode in eight Speedway World Championships and won 44 caps for England. He also won the Southern Riders Championship in 1959 and the Pride of the Nations Trophy in 1963

World final appearances

Individual World Championship
 1952 –  London, Wembley Stadium – 16th – 0pts
 1957 –  London, Wembley Stadium – 11th – 7pts
 1958 –  London, Wembley Stadium – 10th – 7pts
 1959 –  London, Wembley Stadium – 14th – 3pts
 1961 –  Malmö, Malmö Stadion – 9th – 7pts
 1962 –  London, Wembley Stadium – 12th – 6pts
 1963 –  London, Wembley Stadium – 9th – 7pts
 1964 –  Gothenburg, Ullevi – 6th – 10pts

World Team Cup
 1960* -  Göteborg, Ullevi (with Peter Craven / George White / Ken McKinlay / Nigel Boocock) - 2nd - 30pts (7)
 1961* -  Wrocław, Olympic Stadium (with Bob Andrews / Peter Craven / Ken McKinlay) - 3rd - 21pts (3)
 1962 -  Slaný (with Barry Briggs / Ronnie Moore / Peter Craven / Cyril Maidment) - 2nd - 24pts (0)
 1964 -  Abensberg, Abensberg Stadion (with Barry Briggs / Nigel Boocock / Ken McKinlay / Brian Brett) - 3rd - 21pts (2)
* 1960 and 1961 for England. All others for Great Britain.

References 

1929 births
2011 deaths
British speedway riders
English motorcycle racers
Harringay Racers riders
Wimbledon Dons riders
Oxford Cheetahs riders